Charles Frederick Barber (born June 19, 1949) is a Canadian former politician. He served in the Legislative Assembly of British Columbia from 1976 to 1983, as a NDP member for the constituency of Victoria.

This one-time rising star in the provincial NDP had been fined $1,500 for gross indecency involving a 15-year-old boy.
Former Victoria New Democrat MLA Charles Barber had pleaded guilty to the charges which date back to the 1970s.
Barber had invited a teenage street kid back to his home where he engaged him in sexual activities.

Barber who's now a music producer in California, apologized for what he called a mistake in judgment. He says his life was a wreck at the time. The judge agreed to the fine of $1,500, noting the victim did not want Barber to go to jail.

References

1949 births
Living people
British Columbia New Democratic Party MLAs
Politicians from Victoria, British Columbia